Pretty Ricky is the third studio album by Pretty Ricky. It was released on November 17, 2009, and featured new vocalist Lingerie replacing Pleasure P and 4Play.

Commercial performance
The performance of Pretty Ricky was poor in comparison to the group's previous gold-selling albums Bluestars and Late Night Special. It charted for one week on the Billboard 200, at #97.

Singles
Two singles, "Tipsy (In Dis Club)" and "Say a Command", were released from the album, but neither charted on the Billboard Hot 100.

Track listing
 "Intro" – 1:22
 "Say a Command" – 3:45
 "Mr. Goodbar" – 4:02
 "Tipsy (In Dis Club)" – 4:11
 "Smash" – 3:56
 "Menage a Trois" – 4:07
 "Sticky" – 3:47
 "T.R.U.T.H." – 4:43
 "Doggystyle" – 3:12
 "Lapdance" – 3:58
 "Black" – 6:27
 "Discovery Channel (Wild Girl)" – 3:23
 "Prince Charming" – 4:31
 "Downtown" – 3:47
 "Make-Up Sex" – 3:35 (iTunes Bonus Track)

References

2009 albums
Pretty Ricky albums